Gimhae National Museum Station is a station of the BGLRT Line of Busan Metro in Nae-dong, Gimhae, South Korea.

Station Layout

Exits

External links
  Cyber station information from Busan Transportation Corporation

Busan Metro stations
Busan–Gimhae Light Rail Transit
Metro stations in Gimhae
Railway stations opened in 2011